Michael Maynard may refer to:

 Michael Maynard (cricketer) (born 1976), Barbadian cricketer
 Michael Maynard (sailor) (born 1937), British sailor
 Mike Maynard (footballer) Guyanese footballer

See also
 Mike Maynard, American football coach